FC Zhemchuzhina-Sochi was a Russian association football club based in Sochi, Krasnodar Krai founded in 1991 and dissolved in 2012.

History
Zhemchuzhina Sochi was founded in 1991 and named after a hotel which was one of the founders. Zhemchuzhina is Russian for "a pearl". Zhemchuzhina spent one season in the Soviet Second League B (winning zonal tournament), but were entitled to enter Russian First Division in 1992, after the dissolution of the Soviet Union. Zhemchuzhina won the tournament in their zone and were promoted to the Russian Top Division. They spent 7 seasons there, from 1993 to 1999. After another season in the First Division in 2000 Zhemchuzhina went straight down to the Second Division. The club was disbanded after the 2003 season due to financial problems.

In 2004, a new club, Sochi-04, was formed in place of Zhemchuzhina. The former head of Zhemchuzhina, Oleg Shinkaryov, became a chairman of Sochi-04.

Rebirth
In 2007, club was re-established under name "Zhemchuzhina-A". Arsen Naydyonov became manager and vice-president of club. "Zhemchuzhina-A" played in Amateur Football League South zone, the 4th highest-level in 2007. It finished 2nd this league and promoted to South Zone of Russian Second Division for 2008 season. In 2008, it was renamed to FC Zhemchuzhina-Sochi. It promoted to the Russian First Division the 2010 season as champions of South Zone after 9 seasons of absence.

In August 2011 the team withdrew from Russian First Division (FNL).

League history

{|class="wikitable"
|-bgcolor="#efefef"
! Season
! Div.
! Pos.
! Pl.
! W
! D
! L
! GS
! GA
! P
!Cup
!colspan=2|Europe
!Top Scorer (League)
!Head Coach
|-
|align=center|1991
|align=center|4th,Zone 4
|align=center bgcolor="lightgreen"|1
|align=center|42
|align=center|27
|align=center|10
|align=center|5
|align=center|91
|align=center|33
|align=center|64
|align=center|—
|align=center colspan="2"|—
|align=left| Makeev - 24
|align=left| Naydyonov
|-
|align=center|1992
|align=center|2nd,"West"
|align=center bgcolor="lightgreen"|1
|align=center|34
|align=center|24
|align=center|5
|align=center|5
|align=center|84
|align=center|40
|align=center|53
|align=center|—
|align=center colspan="2"|—
|align=left| Gogrichiani - 26
|align=left| Naydyonov
|-
|align=center|1993
|align=center rowspan="7"|1st
|align=center|13
|align=center|34
|align=center|10
|align=center|10
|align=center|14
|align=center|52
|align=center|62
|align=center|30
|align=center|R64
|align=center colspan="2"|—
|align=left| Gogrichiani - 13
|align=left| Naydyonov
|-
|align=center|1994
|align=center|9
|align=center|30
|align=center|8
|align=center|11
|align=center|11
|align=center|44
|align=center|48
|align=center|27
|align=center|R32
|align=center colspan="2"|—
|align=left| Filimonov - 9
|align=left| Naydyonov
|-
|align=center|1995
|align=center|13
|align=center|30
|align=center|8
|align=center|4
|align=center|18
|align=center|36
|align=center|69
|align=center|28
|align=center|R16
|align=center colspan="2"|—
|align=left| Bogatyryov - 10
|align=left| Naydyonov
|-
|align=center|1996
|align=center|15
|align=center|34
|align=center|10
|align=center|6
|align=center|18
|align=center|38
|align=center|57
|align=center|36
|align=center|R16
|align=center colspan="2"|—
|align=left| 3x players - 6
|align=left| Naydyonov
|-
|align=center|1997
|align=center|14
|align=center|34
|align=center|11
|align=center|7
|align=center|16
|align=center|38
|align=center|51
|align=center|40
|align=center|R32
|align=center colspan="2"|—
|align=left| Gogrichiani - 7
|align=left| Naydyonov
|-
|align=center|1998
|align=center|13
|align=center|30
|align=center|9
|align=center|8
|align=center|13
|align=center|31
|align=center|48
|align=center|35
|align=center|R32
|align=center colspan="2"|—
|align=left| Gogrichiani - 4 Kutarba - 4
|align=left| Baidachny
|-
|align=center|1999
|align=center bgcolor="pink"|15
|align=center|30
|align=center|5
|align=center|11
|align=center|14
|align=center|29
|align=center|55
|align=center|26
|align=center|R16
|align=center colspan="2"|—
|align=left| Demenko - 5 Kovalenko - 5
|align=left| Baidachny Antikhovich
|-
|align=center|2000
|align=center|2nd
|align=center bgcolor="pink"|17
|align=center|38
|align=center|12
|align=center|7
|align=center|19
|align=center|48
|align=center|70
|align=center|43
|align=center|R32
|align=center colspan="2"|—
|align=left| Gogrichiani - 7 Suleymanov - 7
|align=left| Naydyonov
|-
|align=center|2001
|align=center rowspan="3"|3rd,"South"
|align=center|9
|align=center|38
|align=center|16
|align=center|6
|align=center|16
|align=center|59
|align=center|47
|align=center|54
|align=center|R32
|align=center colspan="2"|—
|align=left| Avetisyan - 18
|align=left| Sekech
|-
|align=center|2002
|align=center|11
|align=center|40
|align=center|16
|align=center|6
|align=center|18
|align=center|60
|align=center|51
|align=center|54
|align=center|R256
|align=center colspan="2"|—
|align=left| Nikulin - 12
|align=left| Suleymanov
|-
|align=center|2003
|align=center|18
|align=center|38
|align=center|9
|align=center|5
|align=center|24
|align=center|36
|align=center|66
|align=center|32
|align=center|R512
|align=center colspan="2"|—
|align=left| Guguyev - 12
|align=left| Naydyonov Bondaruk
|-
|align=center|2004
|align=center colspan="9"|—
|align=center|R512
|align=center colspan="2"|—
|align=left colspan="2"|
|-
|align=center colspan="15"|2004–2007
|-
|align=center|2007
|align=center|LFL(4th), "South"
|align=center bgcolor="lightgreen"|2
|align=center|30
|align=center|19
|align=center|3
|align=center|8
|align=center|53
|align=center|27
|align=center|60
|align=center|—
|align=center colspan="2"|—
|align=left|
|align=left| Naydyonov
|-
|align=center|2008
|align=center rowspan="2"|3rd,"South"
|align=center|6
|align=center|34
|align=center|14
|align=center|12
|align=center|8
|align=center|48
|align=center|30
|align=center|54
|align=center|—
|align=center colspan="2"|—
|align=left| Pinchuk - 15
|align=left| Gogrichiani
|-
|align=center|2009
|align=center bgcolor="lightgreen"|1
|align=center|34
|align=center|29
|align=center|2
|align=center|3
|align=center|91
|align=center|22
|align=center|89
|align=center|R1024
|align=center colspan="2"|—
|align=left| Dubrovin - 22
|align=left| Vasilenko
|-
|align=center|2010
|align=center Rowspan=2|2nd
|align=center|8
|align=center|38
|align=center|16
|align=center|9
|align=center|13
|align=center|45
|align=center|44
|align=center|57
|align=center|R64
|align=center colspan="2"|—
|align=left| Zebelyan - 6 Demenko - 6
|align=left| Vasilenko Sanaya
|-
|align=center|2011–12
|align=center bgcolor="pink"|20
|align=center|38
|align=center|8
|align=center|2
|align=center|28
|align=center|22
|align=center|81
|align=center|27
|align=center|R32
|align=center colspan="2"|—
|align=left| Papadopulos - 5
|align=left| Cherchesov
|}

Reserve squad
Zhemchuzhina's reserve squad played professionally as FC Zhemchuzhina-d Sochi (Russian Third League in 1995-1997) and FC Zhemchuzhina-2 Sochi (Russian Second Division in 1998-1999). In 1992-1993 the reserves team was based in Adler and played under the name of FC Torpedo Adler.

Another farm club called FC Dynamo-Zhemchuzhina-2 Sochi played professionally in Russian Third League in 1996 and Russian Second League in 1997.

Notable players
Had international caps for their respective countries. Players whose name is listed in bold represented their countries while playing for Zhemchuzhina.

 Denis Boyarintsev
 Maksim Demenko
  Olexandr Gorshkov
 Lyubomir Kantonistov
 Arsen Avetisyan
 Eduard Partsikyan
 Tigran Petrosyan
 Manuk Kakosyan
 Robert Zebelyan
 Kazemır Qudiyev
 Nazim Suleymanov
 Vital Bulyga
 Konstantin Kovalenko
 Gennady Tumilovich
 Uladzimir Zhuravel
 Ricardo Baiano
 Marek Čech
 Michal Papadopulos
 Gocha Gogrichiani
 Zurab Ionanidze
 Davit Janashia
 David Khmelidze
 Dimitri Kudinov
 Ruslan Baltiev
 Kazbek Geteriev
 Konstantin Ledovskikh
 Serghei Covalciuc
 Denis Knitel
 Alexandr Mukanin
 Farkhod Vasiev
 Andriy Vasylytchuk
 Vladimir Shishelov

External links
Official website 
Zhemchuzhina memorial website 
Official fan site 

Defunct football clubs in Russia
Sport in Sochi
Association football clubs established in 1991
Association football clubs disestablished in 2013
 
1991 establishments in Russia
2013 disestablishments in Russia